The 1955 East Carolina Pirates football team was an American football team that represented East Carolina College (now known as East Carolina University) as a member of the North State Conference during the 1955 college football season. In their fourth season under head coach Jack Boone, the team compiled a 4–5 record.

Schedule

References

East Carolina
East Carolina Pirates football seasons
East Carolina Pirates football